Ioversol (INN; trade name Optiray) is an organoiodine compound that is used as a contrast medium.  It features both a high iodine content, as well as several hydrophilic groups. It is used in clinical diagnostics including arthrography, angiocardiography and urography.

References 

Radiocontrast agents
Benzamides
Acetanilides
Iodoarenes